The former site of Qiushi Academy is historic site protected as a Major Historical and Cultural Site Protected at the National Level. The site was made a college campus by Hangzhou mayor Lin Qi in 1897 and became the oldest campus of Zhejiang University and hosted the university until it moved to Yuquan campus in 1956.

History

Puci Temple 
Puci Temple was a Buddhist temple built by the monk Sijing in the Shaoxing era (1131-1162) of the Southern Song dynasty, repaired in the Zhizheng era (1341-1370) of the Yuan dynasty by the monk Yuanzhong, destroyed in the early Ming and rebuilt by the monk Zhijue in the Jiajing era (1522-1566) of the Ming dynasty. In 1889 and 1891, the temple was again rebuilt by the monk Shi Wenda as one of the largest temple in the east part of the city. However, the temple was destroyed before it was fully constructed in a disaster. Thus, the temple was handed over to the local government.

Zhejiang University 

Six years after the disaster, the scholar-officials of Hangzhou, led by Lin Qi, the then-Mayor of Hangzhou, re-utilised the site of the temple to establish Qiushi Academy and Military Academy. Qiushi Academy was renamed as Zhejiang Qiushi University in 1901, as Zhejiang University in 1902 and as Zhejiang Higher Institute in December 1903 and continued to operate until it was closed in 1914. It focused on the so-called "New Learnings" or "New Subjects" (新學 / 新学). It had a study duration of five years, and taught courses including Chinese, English, mathematics, history, geology/geography, physics and chemistry. It also held several foreign lecturers.

In 1927, the site was returned to the alumni of Qiushi Academy and Zhejiang Higher Institute, where the government founded Zhejiang University by merging the Zhejiang Public Industrial School in the neighbouring coinage and Zhejiang Public Agricultural School in Jianqiao. Thereafter, the site became a major campus of Zhejiang University, which hosted its College of Humanities, College of Sciences, College of Engineering and College of Normal Education.

Chinese Medicine College 

After the 1952 reorganisation of Chinese higher education, Zhejiang University was reduced to an engineering specialised university, but remained at the site. After Zhejiang University moved to its Yuquan campus in 1956, the site became seized by Zhejiang Vocational School of Traditional Chinese Medicine, which was later upgraded to Zhejiang Chinese Medicine College. During the time, the westernised buildings of Qiushi Academy was demolished and the current historic site was the main hall of the temple, the only remaining part of Puci Temple.

Protection 
In August 1997, the site became protected as a Major Historical and Cultural Site Protected at the Provincial Level. In 1999, the Chinese Medicine College moved out of the site. In 2005, the land was purchased by the Hangzhou municipal government from the Chinese Medicine College. In 2019, the site was listed as a Major Historical and Cultural Site Protected at the National Level.

External links
 The Qiushi Academy Historic Site (Chinese + Photo)
 The Qiushi Academy - History (Chinese + Photo)

References

History of Zhejiang University
Buddhist temples in Hangzhou